Lumaria zeugmatovalva is a species of moth of the family Tortricidae. It is found in Shanxi, China.

References

	

Moths described in 1984
Archipini